Goatreich – Fleshcult is the fifth studio album by the Austrian blackened death metal band Belphegor.  It was released in 2005.

This was the album to feature the fully developed and recorded "Swarm of Rats", which had existed at least as early as 2002 and was featured on Infernal Live Orgasm.

Track listing

Personnel
 Belphegor
Helmuth Lehner - vocals, guitars
Sigurd Hagenauer - guitars
Bartholomäus "Barth" Resch - bass 
 
 Additional musicians
 Florian "Torturer" Klein - drums
 Mathias "der Hexer" Röderer - synthesizers
 Production
 Alexander Krull - recording, mixing, engineer, mastering, producer
 Helmuth - producer
 Martin Schmidt, Mathias Röderer, Thorsten Bauer - engineer assistant
 Monsieur Morbid aka Ralph-allus Manfreda - cover design
 Mr. Ron Morisson - photography
 Note
 Recorded, engineered, mixed and mastered at Master Sound Studio September–November 2004.

Release history

References
   

Belphegor albums
2005 albums
Napalm Records albums
Albums produced by Alexander Krull